DYK or Dyk may refer to:

 Dyk (surname) or Van Dyk, a surname
 Dongfeng Yueda Kia, a joint automotive manufacturing venture between the Dongfeng Motor Corporation, Kia Motors, and Yueda
 Underwater Demolition Command (Greek: Διοίκηση Υποβρυχίων Καταστροφών), Greek Navy's special warfare unit
 Devil You Know (band), an American rock band

See also
 Did You Know (disambiguation)
 Do You Know (disambiguation)